Kevin Javier Álvarez Hernández (born 3 August 1996) is a Honduran professional footballer who plays as a right-back for F.C. Motagua, and the Honduras national team. He represented Honduras in the football competition at the 2016 Summer Olympics.

Honours
Olimpia
 CONCACAF League: 2017

Individual
 CONCACAF League Team of the Tournament: 2017
 CONCACAF League Best Young Player: 2017

References

External links
 

1993 births
Living people
Honduran footballers
Olympic footballers of Honduras
Honduras international footballers
Honduran expatriate footballers
Expatriate footballers in Sweden
C.D. Olimpia players
IFK Norrköping players
Real C.D. España players
F.C. Motagua players
Liga Nacional de Fútbol Profesional de Honduras players
Allsvenskan players
People from San Pedro Sula
Association football defenders
2015 CONCACAF U-20 Championship players
Footballers at the 2016 Summer Olympics
2021 CONCACAF Gold Cup players